Saint Eleuchadius (died 112) is a 2nd-century Christian saint venerated by the Roman Catholic and Eastern Orthodox Church.

He was a Greek who was converted to Christianity by Saint Apollinaris. He was Bishop of Ravenna from 100 to 112 AD, succeeding Saint Adheritus.

Notes

1st-century births
112 deaths
Saints from Roman Greece
Saints from Roman Italy
2nd-century Christian saints
2nd-century Italian bishops
1st-century Romans
2nd-century Romans
Bishops of Ravenna